Hanazono may refer to:

Places
Hanazono University in Kyoto, Japan
Higashi Osaka Hanazono Rugby Stadium in Higashi Osaka, Osaka Prefecture, Japan
Hanazono, Saitama, former town in Saitama Prefecture, Japan
Hanazono, Wakayama, former village in Wakayama Prefecture, Japan
Hanazono Shrine, a Shinto shrine in Shinjuku, Tokyo, Japan

People
Emperor Hanazono, the 95th emperor of Japan
Utako Hanazono, Japanese geisha

Fictional characters
Hikari Hanazono, in the anime and manga series Special A
Karin Hanazono, in the anime and manga series Kamichama Karin
Sakura Hanazono, in the anime and manga series Kaichō wa Maid-sama!
Shizuma Hanazono, in the anime Strawberry Panic
Tae Hanazono, a character in the multimedia franchise BanG Dream!
Yurine Hanazono, in the anime and manga series Dropkick on My Devil!

See also
Hanazono Station (disambiguation)

Japanese-language surnames